Resistance is an album from Christian hardcore band, Alove for Enemies' on Facedown Records album. The album was produced and engineered by Dean Baltulonis.

Track listing
 "The Resistance"
 "Tread On My Dreams"
 "Hall Of Mirrors"
 "Wishes For The Cloth Of Heaven"
 "Call It Faith"
 "EC-10"
 "Rise Of The Phoenix"
 "Not Without Incident"
 "Welcome To The Underground"
 "Emotion Is Chaos"
 "Will Of Father"

Credits 
 Erich Barto - Vocals
 Dan Valentino - Guitars
 Matt Addeo - Guitars
 Jonathan Hernandez - Drums
 Luke Anthony - Bass, Vocals
 Dean Baltulonis - Producer, Engineer
 Shawn Kimon - Assistant Engineer
 Jennifer Klaverweiden - Photography
 Dave Quiggle - Artwork, Layout

Resistance
Alove for Enemies albums
Facedown Records albums